George Low (1926 – 1984) was the president of Rensselaer Polytechnic Institute from 1976 to 1984.

George Low may also refer to:
G. David Low (1956–2008), American astronaut
George Low (Medal of Honor) (1847–1912), United States Navy sailor, recipient of the Medal of Honor
George MacRitchie Low (1849–1922), Scottish actuary
George Carmichael Low (1872–1952), Scottish parasitologist
George Low Sr. (1874–1950), Scottish golfer
George Low Jr. (1912–1995), American golfer, son of George Low Sr.

See also
George Lowe (disambiguation)